Remanufacturing is "the rebuilding of a product to specifications of the original manufactured product using a combination of reused, repaired and new parts". It requires the repair or replacement of worn out or obsolete components and modules. Parts subject to degradation affecting the performance or the expected life of the whole are replaced. Remanufacturing is a form of a product recovery process that differs from other recovery processes in its completeness: a remanufactured machine should match the same customer expectation as new machines.

In 1995, the United States Environmental Protection Agency (EPA) implemented the Comprehensive Procurement Guideline (CPG) program to promote waste reduction and resource conservation through the use of materials recovered from solid waste, and to ensure that the materials collected in recycling programs will be used again in the manufacture of new products. The EPA is required to designate products that are or can be made with recovered materials, and to recommend practices for buying these products. Once a product is designated, state and federal procuring agencies are required to purchase it with the highest recovered material content level practicable.

In 2004, the EPA published its third CPG update (CPG IV) which designated seven additional products and revised three existing product designations. One of the new product categories to be added was Rebuilt Vehicular Parts. The EPA defines rebuilt vehicular parts as  "vehicle parts that have been re-manufactured, reusing parts in their original form. Rebuilt parts undergo an extensive re-manufacturing and testing process and must meet the same industry specifications for performance as new parts."

In the UK, a market potential of up to 5.6 billion GBP has been identified in remanufacturing, with the benefits said to be improvement to business margins, revenues and security of supply.

Other forms of product recovery
Reuse implies that items are used by a second customer without prior repair operations or as originally designed.
 Repair: the process of bringing damaged components back to a functional condition.
 Refurbishing/Reconditioning is the process of restoring components to a functional and/or satisfactory state to the original specification, using methods such as resurfacing, repainting, etc.
 Recycling is the process of taking a component material and processing it to make the same material or useful degraded material.
 Cannibalization (parts)

Many formal definitions of remanufacturing exist in the literature, but the first published report on remanufacturing, by R. Lund (1984), describes remanufacturing as "... an industrial process in which worn-out products are restored to like-new condition. Through a series of industrial processes in a factory environment, a discarded product is completely disassembled. Useable parts are cleaned, refurbished, and put into inventory. Then the product is reassembled from the old parts (and where necessary, new parts) to produce a unit fully equivalent and sometimes superior in performance and expected lifetime to the original new product".

Furthermore, the Automotive Parts Remanufacturers Association (APRA) realized that communication problems can arise when people from different countries with different language skills talk about remanufacturing. Certain terms can have different meanings as definitions between countries and individuals vary.  In 2013, APRA was able to solve these communication problems by publishing a common translation list in many different languages in order to unite all those who deal with the automotive industry.

Range of products being remanufactured 

 Aerospace
 Automotive Parts	
 Air-conditioning units
 Batteries NiMH/LIO	
 Bakery Equipment	
 Carpet tiles	
 Compressors	
 Computer and telecommunication equipment.	
 Defense equipment	
 Electrical motors and apparatus	
 Excavation equipment	
 Fashion apparel and accessories
 Gaming Machines
 Hydraulic Cylinders
 Industrial food processing equipment	
 Machine tools	
 Medical Equipment
 Musical Instruments 
 Office furniture	
 Office photocopiers (laser toner cartridges)	
 Power bearings	
 Pumps	
 Robots	
 Rolling stock (railway vehicles)	
 Surgical Medical Tables
 Telecommunications Equipment
 Toner Cartridges
 Vehicular Parts	
 Vending Machines

Different types of remanufacturing
There are three main types of remanufacturing activities, each with different operational challenges.
 Remanufacturing without identity loss  With this method, a current machine is built on yesterday's base, receiving all enhancements, expected life and warranty of a new machine. The physical structure (the chassis or frame) is inspected for soundness. The whole product is refurbished and critical modules are overhauled, upgraded or replaced. Any defects in the original design are eliminated. This is the case for customized remanufacturing of machine tools, airplanes, computer mainframes, large medical equipment and other capital goods. Because of its uniqueness, this product recovery is characterized as a project.
 Remanufacturing with loss of original product identity  With this method, used goods are disassembled into pre-determined components and repaired to stock, ready to be reassembled into a remanufactured product. This is the case when remanufacturing automobile components, photocopiers, toner cartridges, furniture, ready-to-use cameras and personal computers. Once the product is disassembled and the parts are recovered, the process concludes with an operation similar to original manufacturing. Disassembled parts are inventoried, just like purchased parts and made available for final assembly.  Remanufacturing with loss of original product identity encompasses some unique challenges in inventory management and disassembly sequence development. Some of the open questions relate to the commonality of parts in products of different generations, the uncertainty in the supply of used products, and their relationship with production planning. The National Center for Remanufacturing and Resource Recovery (NCR3) at Rochester Institute of Technology (NY) is researching remanufacturing processes including testing standards for remanufactured products.
 Repetitive remanufacturing without identity loss  In this method, there is the additional challenge of scheduling the sequence of dependent processes and identifying the location of inventory buffers. There is a fine line between repetitive remanufacturing without loss of identity and product overhaul. The final output has an as-new appearance and is covered by a warranty comparable to that of a new product.

Remanufacturing by Recoating of Worn Engine Parts

In addition to these is a less significant type of remanufacturing, remanufacturing by recoating of worn engine parts. This type of remanufacturing serves many engine parts and other large and expensive components that become worn after a period of use. An example is the engine block, in particular the cylinder engine bores, which must withstand combustion. Instead of disposing of engine blocks, remanufacturing enables re-use by coating them with plasma transferred wire arc spraying (PTWA). Remanufacturing by recoating of parts is also popular in aviation and with geothermal pipe.

Rebuilding
Rebuilding is an old name for remanufacturing. It is still widely used by automotive industry. For example, the Automotive Parts Remanufacturers Association (APRA), have the new term in their name, but to be safe on their own website use the combined term 'rebuild/remanufacture'.

The term 'rebuilding' is also often used by railway companies; a steam locomotive may be rebuilt with a new boiler or a diesel locomotive may be rebuilt with a new engine. This saves money (by re-using the frame, and some other components, which still have years of useful life) and allows the incorporation of improved technology. For example, a new diesel engine may have lower fuel consumption, reduced exhaust emissions and better reliability. Recent examples include British Rail Class 57 and British Rail Class 43.

Benefits of Engine Remanufacturing 
 Lower Cost - One of the biggest factors in choosing a remanufactured engine is cost. Remanufactured engines cost up to 50% less than new Tier 4 Final engines, not including associated engineering costs, and offers even greater savings over the purchase of a new piece of equipment. Maintenance on some new Tier 4 Final engines can be costly as well. In addition to being more complex to service, additional costs for after treatment cleaning and DEF fluid can add up quickly. 
 Less Downtime - Opting to replace existing engines with a new ones typically requires significant engineering time that can render rental equipment out of service for months. The integration and testing process also takes significantly longer with a new Tier 4 Final engine than with remanufactured engines.
 Increased Equipment Resale Value - There are two main factors currently making it difficult to sell Tier 4 Final-powered equipment in lesser regulated countries: serviceability and fuel availability. The lack of established service programs for the new technology makes supporting the product difficult. This coupled with high product costs, have companies shying away from Tier 4 Final powered equipment. In addition, many lesser-regulated countries don't have high availability for ultra-low sulphur diesel fuel, which is required by Tier 4 Final engines to operate effectively. Without it, the diesel particulate filter can clog rapidly and cause significant operation issues.
 More Sustainable Option - Purchasing remanufactured engines keeps old engine cores and many usable components out of landfills, which can greatly reduce the impact on the environment. According to Perkins Pacific's Andy Machin, approximately 73% of old engines can be salvaged during remanufacturing, keeping millions of pounds of waste out of landfills. New engine production requires all new materials, substantial amounts of energy for the production process and additional transportation costs. By utilizing recycled components, a remanufactured engine typically uses about 80% less energy than new engine production, making it a much greener option. For rental fleet owners, remanufacturing offers the opportunity to expand their sustainability practices while saving money.

See also
Conservation and restoration of rail vehicles

References

External links
 http://www.depotintl.com Printer Parts Remanufacturing
 www.metrofuser.com Printer Parts Remanufacturing 
 http://www.remanufacturing.org.uk
 apra-europe.org
 www.prcind.com
  Remanufactured Engines
 Ivor Searle's Engine Remanufacturing Process
 The Environmental Impact of Engine Reconditioning / Remanufacturing

Design for X
Waste management